ClimateWorks Foundation is a San Francisco-based nonprofit organization founded in 2008. ClimateWorks Foundation's mission is to slow global warming by funding other organizations internationally to help find best practice solutions to cut down on carbon dioxide emissions .

In 2016 the nonprofit was listed as one of the Top 100 Largest U.S. Charities by Forbes Magazine. The ClimateWorks Foundation is part of the Partner Circle of the Foundations Platform F20, an international network of foundations and philanthropic organizations.

History 
ClimateWorks Foundation was conceptualized and founded by Hal Harvey for a 2007 “Design to Win” report financed by the Hewlett Foundation and other foundations to examine how philanthropists can fight against global warming. Hal Harvey's plan behind ClimateWorks Foundation is a sketched "Sudoku" plan divided into 5 economic sectors: Power, Industry, Buildings, Transport, & Forest. The plan is meant to address emissions of the world's six heaviest  consuming regions; such as: the United States, China, India, Europe, and Latin America.

The study outlines the zones that produce the most carbon emissions in the planet and systematically approaches the “30 by 30” goal of reducing 30 gigatons of annual heat emissions by the year 2030. Each square from the "Sudoku" plan depicts how many gigatons of carbon could be saved by nation. Dubbed the “ClimateWorks Sudoku”, the Foundation uses this plan in their annual reports and in 2011, reported that China had the potential to save 9.6 gigatons by 2030, while the United States had the potential to save 3.6 gigatons.

Hal Harvey left ClimateWorks Foundation in December, 2011. Harvey is now serving as the new CEO of Energy Innovation and is also a published author of Designing Climate Solutions: A Policy Guide for Low-Carbon Energy. He was succeeded by Julie Blunden as the foundation's new chief executive officer, President, and Director of ClimateWorks on May 21, 2012. Ms. Blunden has 25 years of experience in the energy industry and is a well known energy policy expert with a background in both the industrial and non-profit sectors.

The ClimateWorks foundation has hosted a discussion on "accelerating global climate action", in 2018 at Climate Week NYC.

Efforts 
Efforts by the ClimateWorks Foundation to yield global warming includes sending scientists and experts in energy issues to manufacturing industries by delivering critical awareness and setting reachable goals to lessen carbon dioxide emissions from top nations that produce them. ClimateWorks Foundation has contributed funding to the China Sustainable Energy Program in an effort to stop cement factories from upgrading to larger  emission factories. They also advise factory managers on how to cut down on  emissions through better practices.

ClimateWorks Foundation has also designed techniques to halt global warming for industries such as: construction, manufacturing, transportation, & forest. ClimateWorks Foundation also has a global network of experts and scientists that provide planning and technological concepts to focus on carbon emission in major economic nations by supplying best practices for vehicle emission standards, building codes, & energy efficiency. The foundation also designs eco-friendly houses and awards grants to regional foundations to recognize their resolutions.

Partnerships and donors 
The ClimateWorks Foundation has been partnered with other organizations, through single time donations and continued sponsorship. For example, the Oak foundation has funded the ClimateWorks foundation with $75 million for the development of "responsible global and local governance mechanisms, which will have important ramifications socially as well as environmentally." ClimateWorks has been founded mainly by the Hewlett & Packard Foundation and the McKnight Foundation located in Minnesota.

ClimateWorks has provided funding to Greenpeace India; along with funding from Greenpeace international, ClimateWorks grants composed about 30% of the organization's funding in June 2015. The foundation also funded around $170 million to the Energy Foundation and $1,520,000 to Green tech.

References

External links 
 Official Website

Non-profit organizations based in San Francisco
Foundations based in the United States